The third USS Supply (IX-147/AVS-1) was a freighter and aviation supply ship of the United States Navy during World War II.

The ship was built in 1921 by Doullet and Williams of New Orleans, Louisiana, and was operated by the American Pioneer and American Export Lines as MS Ward. Ward sailed from Hoboken, New Jersey, to Pearl Harbor, on 25 November 1943, after calling at Norfolk, Virginia, and Oakland, California, to load aviation material. Upon her arrival at Pearl Harbor the ship was to be allocated to the Navy, on a bareboat basis, by the War Shipping Administration. Ward was acquired by the Navy at Pearl Harbor on 5 February 1944 and commissioned on 8 February 1944 as Supply (IX-147).

Service history
The ship entered the Navy Yard there for repairs, alterations, and conversion into an auxiliary aviation supply ship. Supply departed Pearl Harbor on 25 March for Majuro, Marshall Islands, to replenish aircraft carriers for further strikes west of those islands. After the fleet sailed, Supply steamed to Roi-Namur, on 22 April, and operated as an aviation supply depot there until early July.

Supply sailed for Pearl Harbor on 7 July, where she underwent extensive alterations to enable her to double the amount of stores that could be kept in a ready-for-issue status. The ship sailed for Yap, Caroline Islands, to assist in setting up an aviation supply depot there. Pending the military operation against the island, the supply ship was routed to Peleliu, via Funafuti, Tulagi, and Manus, arriving on 14 October, the day the island was declared secure. As she could not anchor there, Supply moved up to Kossol Passage. The ship remained there for a month supplying Marine Air Group (MAG) 11 with aircraft stores. On 15 November, she steamed to the fleet anchorage at Ulithi where she assisted PBM tenders and MAG 45 for several weeks. At this time it was decided that Yap was to be bypassed, and the ship's destination was changed to Guam, M.I.

Supply arrived at Guam on 7 December 1944, and by 7 February 1945 had stripped herself of all supplies. She returned to Roi to replenish and then sailed for Saipan on 3 March. Her next mission was to assist in establishing an aviation supply depot at Okinawa. However, due to the kamikaze attacks on the fleet there, it was decided to retain the ship in the Mariana Islands until the island was secured. On 25 May, Supply was redesignated from Unclassified Miscellaneous IX-147 to Aviation Supply Ship AVS-1.

Supply finally sailed for Okinawa on 8 July and arrived there a week later. She first discharged her top-loaded cargo to seaplane tenders and then began transferring bulk stores to the beaches. The ship was at Okinawa when hostilities with Japan ceased. She remained there until 3 November when she weighed anchor en route to the United States, via Pearl Harbor.

Supply arrived at San Diego and unloaded her cargo at the naval air base before proceeding to San Francisco for inactivation. The ship arrived at San Francisco on 19 December 1945 and was decommissioned on 4 February 1946. Supply was returned to the War Shipping Administration the same date she was decommissioned and struck from the Navy List on 25 February 1946. Supply was sold by the Maritime Commission on 26 January 1947 to the Florida Pipe and Supply Co.

Awards
Supply received one battle star for World War II service.

References

External links
 

 

Design 1037 ships of the United States Navy
Ships built in New Orleans
1921 ships
Unclassified miscellaneous vessels of the United States Navy
World War II auxiliary ships of the United States